Sir George Wombwell, 2nd Baronet (14 March 1769 – 28 October 1846) was an English first-class cricketer with amateur status who played for the Marylebone Cricket Club. He was the son of Sir George Wombwell, 1st Baronet and succeeded his father in 1780. As a cricketer he was recorded in one first-class match in 1792, totalling 19 runs with a highest score of 19.

He married twice: firstly Lady Anne Belasyse, daughter of Henry Belasyse, 2nd Earl Fauconberg of Newborough, Yorkshire with whom he had two sons, and secondly Eliza Little, daughter of T. E. Little with whom he had a son and a daughter. He was succeeded by his eldest son Sir George Wombwell, 3rd Baronet.

References

Bibliography
 

1769 births
1846 deaths
English cricketers
English cricketers of 1787 to 1825
Marylebone Cricket Club cricketers
Baronets in the Baronetage of Great Britain